The Secrets She Keeps is an Australian psychological thriller drama television series that officially premiered on Network 10 on 22 April 2020 at 8:45 pm. The series is written by Sarah Walker and Jonathan Gavin, based on the psychological thriller novel by Michael Robotham.

The first season was given a special release on 10 Play on 4 April 2020 as a part of the streaming website's "10 shows in 10 days" promotion during the COVID-19 pandemic. A second season premiered on streaming service Paramount+ on 12 July 2022.

Premise

The series is set in Sydney and is about two women from vastly different backgrounds with explosive secrets that could destroy everything they hold dear.

Cast
 Laura Carmichael as Agatha Fyfle
 Jessica De Gouw as Meghan Shaughnessy
 Michael Dorman (season 1) and Todd Lasance (season 2) as Jack Shaughnessy
 Ryan Corr as Simon Beecher
 Michael Sheasby as Hayden Cole
 Cariba Heine as Grace
 Jenni Baird as Rhea Bowden
 Elizabeth Alexander as Renee Cole
 Hazem Shammas as Cyrus Haven
 Mansoor Noor as Jeremy Clay
 Eva Greenwood as Lucy Shaughnessy

Episodes

Series overview

Season 1 (2020)

Season 2 (2022)

International broadcast

In Ireland, the series was broadcast on RTÉ One from 9 June 2020 and made available to stream on RTÉ Player. Season 2 was broadcast from 2 August 2022 on RTÉ One and RTÉ Player. 

In the United Kingdom, the series is broadcast through the BBC. The first season was allocated a primetime slot on BBC One in July 2020, and all episodes were concurrently available on BBC iPlayer.

The show screens on streaming service Sundance Now in the United States.

References

External links
  – official site
 
 The Secrets She Keeps production site at Lingo Pictures
 

APRA Award winners
2020s Australian drama television series
2020 Australian television series debuts
Television shows set in New South Wales
Network 10 original programming
Paramount+ original programming
Television shows based on books
English-language television shows